

National team

Intercontinental Futsal Cup

Futsal European Clubs Championship

Top League

8th Russian futsal championship 1999/2000

Promotion tournament

National Cup

Final Four

First League. Division A

First League. Division B

Final stage

Women's League
8th Russian women futsal championship 1999/2000

Women's National Cup

References

Russia
Seasons in Russian futsal
futsal
futsal